Alexander Lyon Macfie is a British historian who has written widely on historiography and Orientalism. Macfie completed his undergraduate studies at the University of Manchester in the 1950s, later completing a PhD. More recently, he has been closely associated with the Institute of Historical Research at the University of London and their philosophy of history seminar, attendance at which has influenced his thinking on historiography.

Selected publications
The Straits question in the First World War, 1914-18. Cass, 1983.
The Straits question 1908-36. Institute for Balkan Studies, Thessaloniki, 1993.
The Eastern Question, 1774-1923. Longman, London, 1989. (Seminar Studies in History) (2nd edition, 1996) 
Atatürk. Longman, London, 1994. 
The End of the Ottoman Empire, 1908-1923. Routledge, 1998.
Orientalism: A Reader. Edinburgh University Press, Edinburgh, 2000. (Editor) 
Orientalism. Routledge, 2002.
Eastern Influences on Western Philosophy: A Reader. Edinburgh University Press, Edinburgh, 2003. (Editor) 
The Philosophy of History Talks Given at the Institute of Historical Research, London, 2000-2006. Palgrave Macmillan, 2006. 
The Fiction of History. Routledge, Abingdon, 2014. (Routledge Approaches to History)

References 

Living people
Year of birth missing (living people)
Alumni of the University of Manchester
Historiographers
British historians
Scholars of Ottoman history